Asociación Deportiva Ceuta was a Spanish football team based in the autonomous city of Ceuta. Founded in 1996, its last season was 2011–12 in Segunda División B, holding home matches at Estadio Alfonso Murube, with a capacity of 6,500.

History
Agrupación Deportiva Ceuta, another team from the city, was founded in 1972 and folded in 1991. The club played once in the Segunda División, in 1980–81.

In 1997 Asociación Deportiva Ceuta was born, reaching the third level in only two years; in its first decades of existence, it appeared – without success – in five second division promotion play-offs.

On 1 July 2012, Ceuta was relegated to  the Tercera División for unpaid wages to its players.

After 2011–12 season, the club was administratively relegated to Regional Preferente de Ceuta due to unpaid wages from the previous season. Shortly after, club was disbanded with a €600,000 total debt. In 2013, a new club called Agrupación Deportiva Ceuta Fútbol Club was founded to inherit the club's history.

Club background
Asociación Deportiva Ceuta — (1997–2012)Other clubs from CeutaCeuta Sport Club — (1932-56); renamed in 1941 to Sociedad Deportiva CeutaSociedad Deportiva Ceuta — (1941-56); in 1956 merged with the Spanish elements of Club Atlético Tetuán to form  Club Atlético de CeutaClub Atlético de Ceuta — (1956–); renamed in 2013 to Agrupación Deportiva Ceuta Fútbol ClubClub Deportivo Imperio de Ceuta — (1958–)Agrupación Deportiva Ceuta — (1969–91)Club Ceutí Atlético – (1996–97)Agrupación Deportiva Ceuta Fútbol Club'' — (2013–)

Rivalry
The Ceuta-Melilla derby was between Ceuta and UD Melilla. The two clubs travelled to each other via the Spanish mainland to avoid entering Morocco.

Season to season

14 seasons in Segunda División B
2 seasons in Tercera División

Final squad

Famous players

See also
AD Ceuta B, reserve team

References

External links
Futbolme team profile 
Unofficial website 

 
Defunct football clubs in Spain
Football clubs in Ceuta
Association football clubs established in 1996
Association football clubs disestablished in 2012
1996 establishments in Spain
2012 disestablishments in Spain